2nd Independent Division of Jiangsu Provincial Military District was formed in September 1966 from the Public Security Contingent of Jiangsu province. The division was composed of six regiments (1st to 6th).

In May 1976 the division was disbanded.

References

J2
Military units and formations established in 1966
Military units and formations disestablished in 1976